Tatobotys tanyscia is a moth in the family Crambidae. It was described by West in 1931. It is found in the Philippines (Palawan).

References

Moths described in 1931
Spilomelinae
Insects of the Philippines